Thalleulia gracilescens is a species of moth of the family Tortricidae. It is found in Pichincha Province, Ecuador.

The wingspan is about 17.5 mm.  The ground colour of the forewings is cinnamon brown, but paler and mixed with pearl grey in the distal third. There is brown transverse strigulation (fine streaks) and there are brown lines. The hindwings are pale brown, but paler basally.

Etymology
The species name refers to the strongly tapering terminal parts of the genitalia (the uncus and gnathos) and is derived from gracilescens (meaning tapered).

References

Moths described in 2004
Euliini